Abdur Rahim Khan may refer to:

 Abdur Rahim Khan (1925–1990), Pakistani air officer
 Abdur Rahim Khan (politician) (born 1966), Indian politician
 Abdur Rahim Khan (governor) (1886–?), Afghan governor